Gerakan, meaning movement in Malay, can refer to:

Parti Gerakan Rakyat Malaysia, a Malaysian political party
Gerakan Pramuka Indonesia, an Indonesian scouting movement
Gerakan Mujahidin Islam Patani (GMIP), also known as the Pattani Islamic Mujahideen Movement, a Malay-Muslim terrorist group from southern Thailand